Preston is an unincorporated community in Sonoma County, California, United States.

History 
Preston derives its name from Madame Emily Preston (née Burke), a faith healer who established a religious colony and health resort at her husband's ranch in 1875. Revenue from Preston's ministry and the settlement of followers in the area led to the construction of a church, railroad depot, post office, and a commercial district on both sides of the Russian River. The community began a slow decline after Preston's death in 1909, continuing to hold services into the 1940s.

Most of the buildings associated with the Preston community were destroyed in a wildfire in 1988.

"The Preston Parasite" Sightings 
Prior to the wildfire of 1988, residents of Preston reported multiple sightings of a sea-serpent like creature in the rapids of the Russian River. In 1985, a townsman reported that the creature looked like a "large leech," his son substantiating his claim by alleging that the creature resembled a snake. More reports of this sighting were spread amongst the community until the final recorded report in 1987, when a visitor from Cloverdale claimed that she saw long, gray shape moving against the current underneath the water. These claims are unsubstantiated and lack evidence, only being popularized through word of mouth. Theorists have posited that the "Preston Parasite" could be explained and debunked by an overgrown Sacramento pikeminnow, a North American river otter, or a harbor seal, all of which can be found in the Russian River.

References

Unincorporated communities in California
Unincorporated communities in Sonoma County, California